Dilbert Elmo Hardy (September 3, 1914 – October 17, 2002) was an American entomologist who specialized in Diptera systematics.

Biography
Hardy was born on September 3, 1914 in Lehi, Utah.  He died on October 17, 2002 in Honolulu, Hawaii. He was married to Agnes Thomas Hardy who played a pivotal role in supporting his education, his career as well as illustrating his scientific articles.

Legacy
In over 70 years of research Hardy published 437 articles and notes in which he named and described nearly 2,000 species in 34 different families of Diptera. He made significant contributions to taxonomy and systematics of flies from the Asia-Pacific Region in particular.

Works
Pipunculidae and Bibionidae
Australian/Oceanian Diptera Catalogue Bibionidae
"Family Scenopinidae (Omphralidae)." In N. Papavero, (ed.) A Catalogue of the Diptera of the Americas South of the United States, pp. 32.1-32.5, Departamento de Zoologia, Secretaria da Agricultura. São Paulo, Brazil, 1966.
"Family Scenopinidae (Omphralidae)" in A. Stone, C.W. Sabrowsky, W.W. Wirth, R.M. Foote & J.R. Caulson (eds), A Catalogue of Diptera of North America, pp. 354–356, Smithsonian Publication, Washington D.C., 1983.
(with others) Guide of the insects of Connecticut Part VI. The Diptera or true flies of Connecticut Sixth Fascicle: March flies and gall midges. Bibionidae, Itonididae (Cecidomiidae). Conn. Geol. Nat. Hist. Surv. Bull. 87, 218 pp., 15 pl., 29 figs. 
"The Bibionidae (Diptera) of Nepal, results of the Austrian and the B.P. Bishop Museum Expeditions, 1961 and 1965." Pacific Insects 9(3): 519–536, 1967. 
with Delfinado, M.D. "The Bibionidae (Diptera) of the Philippines." Pacific Insects 11(1): 117–154, 1969.

Collections
 Hardy's Diptera collection is in the Bishop Museum in Hawaii.

Notes

1914 births
2002 deaths
American entomologists
Dipterists
20th-century American zoologists